Eva Philbin (4 January 1914 – 24 June 2005) was an Irish chemist who became the first woman president of the Institute of Chemistry of Ireland. 
Born Eva Maria Ryder in Ballina, County Mayo, Ireland, Philbin received her B.Sc with first class honors and M.Sc from University College Galway. While at University College Galway she worked under Tom Dillon where they worked on identifying carbohydrates in seaweed. She began her career in 1939 as an industrial chemist and was chief chemist at Hygeia Ltd in Galway during World War II.  At Hygeia she was responsible for developing alternative sources for chemicals that were unavailable due to the war.

In 1945, Philbin joined the staff at University College, Dublin.  There she collaborated with Professor Thomas S. Wheeler to establish an active research school in Natural Product Chemistry. In 1958, Philbin was awarded a doctorate of science (DSc) from the National University of Ireland for her published work on flavonoids. Philbin became organic chemistry professor in 1962 and in 1963, took over as head of the chemistry department at UCD following the death of Prof. Wheeler. She continued to work on flavonoids, related compounds and potential anti-cancer agents through collaborations with other UCD staff.

Over her long career, Philbin became a fellow of the Royal Society of Chemistry and a member of the Council of the Royal Irish Academy and the Natural Science Council. Philbin became the first woman to chair the National Science Council, was the first female senior vice-president of the Royal Irish Academy, and was the first woman president of the Institute of Chemistry in 1966.
Since 2007, the Institute of Chemistry of Ireland Annual Award for Chemistry lectures series has been named in her honor as the Eva Philbin Public Lecture Series.

Philbin's interests ranged beyond science, taking a strong interest in the treatment of those with learning difficulties, leading her to take up the chair of the Consultative Council on Mental Handicap as well as becoming honorary treasurer of the National Association for the Mentally Handicapped of Ireland.

Her eldest daughter Eimear married broadcaster and historian John Bowman. Philbin died in 2005, aged 91.

External Resources 

 List of Eva Philbin's Scientific Contributions, Researchgate
 Pioneering Women Professors

References

1914 births
2005 deaths
Irish chemists
Irish women chemists
Members of the Royal Irish Academy
20th-century women scientists